The following are the national records in athletics in Democratic Republic of the Congo maintained by DR Congo's national athletics federation: Fédération d'Athlétisme du Congo (FAC).

Outdoor

Key to tables:  

h = hand timing

A = affected by altitude

OT = oversized track (> 200m in circumference)

a = aided road course

Men

Women

Indoor

Men

Women

References
General
World Athletics Statistic Handbook 2019: National Outdoor Records
World Athletics Statistic Handbook 2018: National Indoor Records
Specific

External links

Congo
Athletics
Records
Athletics